The Muskogee Turnpike, also designated State Highway 351 (SH-351), is a toll road in eastern Oklahoma.

Route description
Opened in 1969, the 53-mile (85.2 km) route begins at the Broken Arrow Expressway (SH-51) southeast of Tulsa, near an intersection with the Creek Turnpike.  The Turnpike ends at Interstate 40 west of Webbers Falls.  The Muskogee Turnpike's north section is connected to its south section by Oklahoma 165.

History

The Muskogee Turnpike originally bore no numbered designation. On March 10, 2014, the Oklahoma Transportation Commission unanimously approved a motion to apply the SH-351 designation to the turnpike.

Tolls
, a two-axle vehicle pays $3.50 cash ($3.20 with Pikepass) to drive the full length of the Turnpike. There are two toll collection plazas located along the length of the Muskogee Turnpike.

Services
This concession plaza has an EZ Go gasoline station selling Phillips 66 gasoline, as well as a McDonald's restaurant. The concession plaza has free restrooms, is open 24 hours a day, and is located in the median for easy access from both travel directions. Groundwork was laid out for a second concession plaza just north of the Muskogee Main Line collection plaza; however this plaza was never built, and all pavement and ramps have since been removed.

Law enforcement along the Muskogee Turnpike is provided by Oklahoma Highway Patrol Troop XB, a special troop assigned to the turnpike.

Exit list

See also 
 Oklahoma Turnpike Authority
 Pikepass

References

External links

Muskogee Turnpike Toll/Fares Chart - Oklahoma Turnpike Authority

Toll roads in Oklahoma
Transport infrastructure completed in 1969
Transportation in Wagoner County, Oklahoma
Transportation in Muskogee County, Oklahoma